Yu the Great (大禹) was a legendary king in ancient China who was famed for his introduction of flood control, his establishment of the Xia dynasty which inaugurated dynastic rule in China, and his upright moral character. He figures prominently in the Chinese legend of "Great Yu Who Controlled the Waters".

The dates which have been proposed for Yu's reign predate the oldest-known written records in China, the oracle bones of the late Shang dynasty, by nearly a millennium. Yu's name was not inscribed on any artifacts which were produced during the proposed era in which he lived, nor was it  inscribed on the later oracle bones; his name was first inscribed on vessels which date back to the Western Zhou period (c. 1045–771 BC).

The lack of substantial contemporary documentary evidence has caused some controversy over Yu's historicity. Thus, proponents of his existence theorize that stories about his life and reign were orally transmitted in various areas of China until they were eventually recorded during the Zhou dynasty, while opponents of it believe that the figure existed in legend in a different form—as a god or a mythical beast—during the Xia dynasty, and morphed into a human figure by the start of the Zhou dynasty. Many of the stories about Yu were collected in Sima Qian's famous Records of the Grand Historian. Yu and other "sage-kings" of Ancient China were lauded for their virtues and morals by Confucius and other Chinese teachers.

Yu is one of the few Chinese monarchs who is posthumously honored with the epithet "the Great".

Name
Shuowen Jiezi (121 BC) gives the earliest Chinese dictionary definition of yu : "a 'bug, reptile', from the 'animal trampling tracks' radical, a 'pictograph'".

Sinologist Axel Schuessler reconstructs 's Old Chinese pronunciation as *waɁ, and compares it to either Proto-Tibeto-Burman *was "bee; honey" or Proto-Waic *wak "insect" (further from Proto-Palaungic *ʋaːk).

Ancestry and early life

Chinese sources uniformly asserted that Yu was the son of Gun (鯀) (lit. "big fish"), though they differed on Gun's origins. According to Sima Qian's Records of the Grand Historian, Yu's father was Gun, grandfather was Zhuanxu, great-grandfather was Changyi, and great-great-grandfather was the Yellow Emperor, Changyi & Gun being mere officials, not emperors. Book of Han, quoting Lord Yu Imperial Lineage, stated that Yu's father Gun was a five-generation-descendant of Zhuanxu. The Classic of Mountains and Seas stated that Yu's father Gun (also known as "White Horse" 白馬, Báimǎ) was the son of Luómíng, who in turn was the son of the Yellow Emperor.

Yu's father, Gun, was enfeoffed at Shiniu of Mount Wen, in modern-day Beichuan County, Sichuan Province; Yu was said to have been potentially born there, though there are debates as to whether he was born in Shifang instead. Yu's mother was of the Youxin clan (有莘氏) named either Nüzhi or Nüxi. His surname was Si, later Xia after the state he was enfeoffed with, while his personal name was Wenming, according to the Records of the Grand Historian.

When Yu was a child, Emperor Yao enfeoffed Gun as lord of Chong, usually identified as the middle peak of Mount Song. Yu is thus believed to have grown up on the slopes of Mount Song, just south of the Yellow River. He later married a woman from Mount Tu who is generally referred to as Tushanshi. They had a son named Qi, a name literally meaning "revelation".

The location of Mount Tu has always been disputed. The two most probable locations are Mount Tu in Anhui Province and the Tu Peak of the Southern Mountain in Chongqing Municipality.

Personality
According to the Records of the Grand Historian, Yu was described as a credulous, hard working, quick witted  person with moral.

Great Yu controls the waters

During the reign of Emperor Yao, the Chinese heartland was frequently plagued by floods that prevented further economic and social development. Yu's father, Gun, was tasked with devising a system to control the flooding. He spent more than nine years building a series of dikes and dams along the riverbanks, but all of this was ineffective, despite (or because of) the great number and size of these dikes and the use of a special self-expanding soil. As an adult, Yu continued his father's work and made a careful study of the river systems in an attempt to learn why his father's great efforts had failed.

Collaborating with Hou Ji, a semi-mythical agricultural master, Yu successfully devised a system of flood controls that were crucial in establishing the prosperity of the Chinese heartland. Instead of directly damming the rivers' flow, Yu made a system of irrigation canals which relieved floodwater into fields, as well as spending great effort dredging the riverbeds. Yu is said to have eaten and slept with the common workers and spent most of his time personally assisting the work of dredging the silty beds of the rivers for the thirteen years the projects took to complete. The dredging and irrigation were successful, and allowed ancient Chinese culture to flourish along the Yellow River, Wei River, and other waterways of the Chinese heartland. The project earned Yu renown throughout Chinese history, and is referred to in Chinese history as "Great Yu Controls the Waters". In particular, Mount Longmen along the Yellow River had a very narrow channel which blocked water from flowing freely east toward the ocean. Yu is said to have brought a large number of workers to open up this channel, which has been known ever since as "Yu's Gateway".

Apocryphal stories
In a mythical version of this story, presented in Wang Jia's 4th-century AD work Shi Yi Ji, Yu is assisted in his work by a yellow dragon (黃龍) and a black turtle (玄龜) (not necessarily related to the Black Tortoise (玄武) in Chinese mythology). Another local myth says that Yu created the Sanmenxia in the Yellow River by cutting a mountain ridge with a divine battle-axe to control flooding. This is perhaps a reference to a meteorite stone—something hard enough to etch away at the hard bedrock of Mount Longmen.

Traditional stories say that Yu sacrificed a great deal of his body to control the floods. For example, his hands were said to be thickly callused, and his feet were completely covered with calluses. In one common story, Yu had only been married four days when he was given the task of fighting the flood. He said goodbye to his wife, saying that he did not know when he would return. During the thirteen years of flooding, he passed by his own family's doorstep three times, but each time he did not return inside his own home. The first time he passed, he heard that his wife was in labor. The second time he passed by, his son could already call out to his father. His family urged him to return home, but he said it was impossible as the flood was still going on. The third time Yu was passing by, his son was more than ten years old. Each time, Yu refused to go in the door, saying that as the flood was rendering countless number of people homeless, he could not rest.

Yu supposedly killed Gonggong's minister Xiangliu, a nine-headed snake monster.

Nine Provinces

Emperor Shun, who reigned after Yao, was so impressed by Yu's engineering work and diligence that he passed the throne to Yu instead of to his own son. Yu is said to have initially declined the throne, but was so popular with other local lords and chiefs that he agreed to become the new emperor, at age 53. He established a capital at Anyi, the ruins of which are in modern Xia County in southern Shanxi Province, and founded what would be called the Xia dynasty, traditionally considered China's first dynasty.

Yu's flood control work is said to have made him intimately familiar with all regions of what was then Han Chinese territory. According to his Yu Gong treatise in the Book of Documents, Yu divided the Chinese "world" into nine zhou or provinces. These were Jizhou, Yanzhou, Qingzhou, Xuzhou, Yangzhou, Jingzhou, Yuzhou, Liangzhou and Yongzhou.

According to the Rites of Zhou there was no Xuzhou or Liangzhou, instead there were Youzhou and Bingzhou, but according to the Erya there was no Qingzhou or Liangzhou, instead there was Youzhou and Yingzhou. Either way there were nine divisions. Once he had received bronze from these nine territories, he created ding vessels called the Nine Tripod Cauldrons. Yu then established his capital at Yang City. it is said in the book of documents that the maio people  rebelled under there leader but he treated them bad so many left he fought with yu who had the intention to kill him but after defeating him spared him and reformed him for 3 years he became wise and ruled well and the people came back.  the Bamboo Annals says Yu killed one of the northern leaders, Fangfeng to reinforce his hold on the throne.

Death

According to the Bamboo Annals, Yu ruled the Xia Dynasty for forty-five years and, according to Yue Jueshu, he died from an illness. It is said that he died at Mount Kuaiji, south of present-day Shaoxing, while on a hunting tour to the eastern frontier of his empire, and was buried there. The Yu mausoleum known today was first built in the 6th century AD (Southern and Northern Dynasties period) in his honor. It is located four kilometers southeast of Shaoxing city. Most of the structure was rebuilt many times in later periods. The three main parts of the mausoleum are the Yu tomb, temple and memorial. Sima Qian once "went to Kuaiji and explored the cave of Yu". The tomb faces east and west and has a grate gate, a canal and a pavilion for the Great Yu Tomb. In many statues he is seen carrying an ancient hoe. A number of emperors in imperial times traveled there to perform ceremonies in his honor, notably Qin Shi Huang.

Historicity
Because no contemporary documentary evidence about Yu survives, there is some controversy as to the historicity of this figure. No inscriptions on artifacts dated to the supposed era of Yu, or the later oracle bones, contain any mention of Yu. The first archeological evidence of Yu comes from vessels made about a thousand years after his supposed death, during the Western Zhou dynasty.

The Doubting Antiquity School of early-20th-century historians, for example, theorized that Yu was not a person in the earliest legends, but rather a god or mythical beast who was connected with water and possibly with the mythical legend Dragon Kings and their control over water. According to this theory, Yu (as god or beast) was represented on ceremonial bronzes by the early Xia people, and by the start of the Zhou Dynasty, the legendary figure had morphed into the first man, who could control water, and it was only during the Zhou Dynasty that the legendary figures that now precede Yu were added to the orthodox legendary lineage. According to the Chinese legend Yu the Great was a man-god.

Archaeological evidence of a large outburst flood at Jishi Gorge on the Yellow River has been dated to about 1920 B.C. This coincides with new cultures all along the Yellow River. The water control problems after the initial flooding could plausibly have lasted for some twenty years. Wu and coauthors suggest that this supports the idea that the stories of Yu the Great may have originated from a historical person.

Legacy

Yu was long regarded as an ideal ruler and kind of philosopher king by the ancient Chinese. Beichuan, Wenchuan, and Dujiangyan in Sichuan have all made claims to be his birthplace.

Owing to his involvement in China's mythical Great Flood, Yu also came to be regarded as a water deity in Taoism and the Chinese folk religions. He is the head of the "Five Kings of the Water Immortals" honored in shrines in Matsu temples as protectors of ships in transit.

His personal name eventually became a Chinese surname. The name was a simplification of minor kingdom 鄅, in modern-day Shandong. After its conquest by the state of Lu, its subjects adopted Yu as a surname.
According to Zhan Guo Ce, alcohol was invented during his reign by the brewer Yidi (儀狄).

See also

Family tree of ancient Chinese emperors
 Flood myth
 Great Flood (China)
 Natural disasters in China
 Yubu
Rishu
Xi Zhong, the minister claimed to have served for the emperor and invented the chariot according to some Chinese sources

References

Sources 

 
 

Legendary Chinese people
Flood myths
Legendary monarchs
People whose existence is disputed
River regulation
Xia dynasty kings
Founding monarchs